Phalaenopsis hygrochila, also known as 湿唇兰 (shi chun lan) in Chinese, is a species of epiphytic orchid native to Assam, Borneo, China South-Central, China Southeast, East Himalaya, Laos, Malaya, Myanmar, Bangladesh, Nepal, Sumatera, Thailand, Vietnam and West Himalaya.

Taxonomy 
This species has a complex taxonomic history and has been previously assigned to several genera.

Description
The 5–10 cm, sometimes up to 20 cm long stems are 8–15 mm wide and enclosed within persistent leaf sheaths. They bear oblong to obovate-oblong, unequally bilobed, coriaceous leaves, between 17 and 29 cm in length and 3.5-5.5 cm in width. Yellow flowers of 4–5 cm in diameter with purple spotting and a white lip with lavender colouration on the midlobe are produced on 5-8 flowered, axillary and often pendent inflorescences. One plant may produce up to 6 inflorescences at a time. Flowering occurs throughout June and July. The diploid chromosome count is 2n = 38. Each pollinium is completely divided into two unequal halves. The seeds are 238.7 µm long and 81.2 µm wide.

Gallery

Ecology
The plants are found in open forests in elevations of 700–1300 m.

Conservation
This species is protected unter the CITES appendix II regulations of international trade.

Horticulture
It has been utilized as an ornamental plant and cut flowers have been traded commercially, both locally and internationally. Artificial propagation and genetic transformation protocols were established.

References

hygrochila
Orchids of Vietnam
Orchids of Thailand
Orchids of Myanmar
Orchids of Laos
Orchids of India
Orchids of China